Banjar Baru is a district (kecamatan) located in the Tulang Bawang Regency of Lampung in Sumatra, Indonesia.

Border
Banjar Baru is bordered by Banjar Agung District to the North, Menggala District to the South, Gedung Aji District to the East and West Tulang Bawang Regency to the West.

References

External links
  

tulang Bawang Regency
districts of Lampung